This is a list of spaceflights launched between October and December 1964. For launches in the rest of the year, see 1964 in spaceflight (January–March), 1964 in spaceflight (April–June) and 1964 in spaceflight (July–September). For an overview of the whole year, see 1964 in spaceflight.

Launches

|colspan=8 style="background:white;"|

October
|-

|colspan=8 style="background:white;"|

November
|-

|colspan=8 style="background:white;"|

December
|-

|}

References

Footnotes

10
1964 in spaceflight 10